Dallas Market Center is a 5 million square foot (460,000 m2) wholesale trade center in Dallas, Texas, the United States, located at 2200 Stemmons Freeway, housing showrooms which sells consumer products including gifts, lighting, home décor, apparel, fashion accessories, shoes, tabletop/housewares, gourmet, floral, and holiday products. The marketplace is closed to the public but open to certified retail buyers and interior designers, manufacturers, and industry professionals. Large-scale market events are held at the center throughout the year. Dallas Market Center is owned by Dallas-based Crow Holdings and managed by Market Center Management Company (MCMC), a Crow Holdings subsidiary.

The center was the destination of U.S. President John F. Kennedy's motorcade when he was assassinated in Dealey Plaza on November 22, 1963.

The campus 
The four-building campus includes the World Trade Center, Trade Mart, International Trade Plaza (The Plaza), and Market Hall. Inside these buildings, nearly 2,300 permanent showrooms offer more than 35,000 product lines from manufacturers around the world.

Trammell Crow developed the nearby Dallas Decorative Center, which opened in 1955.

The two-story International Trade Plaza, which opened in 1957, is the first building at the current site of Dallas Market Center. The original name for this building was the Dallas Homefurnishings Mart, designed by Donald H. Speck. The  building was repurposed in 1999 as the International Floral & Gift Center and later in 2012 as The International Trade Plaza. The current name is the Interior Home + Design Center following a renovation in 2017.

The Dallas Trade Mart, the second Dallas Market Center building, was designed by Harold Berry, Donald Speck, and Harwell Hamilton Harris and opened its doors in 1958. The project provided  of showroom space and cost $12.64 million. It is four stories tall and the atrium at its center is named The Grand Pavilion.

Market Hall, which opened in 1960 and is across Market Center Boulevard from the rest of the campus, is the only building that is open to the public with more than 60 shows per year. It has  of floor space.

For four decades, the building served as a trading center for women's, men's, and children's apparel and accessories. It closed in 2004, and the 600 tenants were moved to the World Trade Center. Today, apparel and accessories showrooms reside on the top floors of World Trade Center, and apparel trade events held at Dallas Market Center attract buyers from around the world.

The largest building and centerpiece of the campus is the World Trade Center, opened in 1974 with seven stories. It was expanded in 1979 to have  of floor space and 15 stories. Inside the World Trade Center are showrooms including gifts, home accessories, lighting, floral, holiday, jewelry, rugs, toys, gourmet foods, furniture, and linens.

History 
Dallas Market Center was founded in 1957 by real estate developer Trammell Crow. The first trade event at Dallas Market Center was held in July 1957 and was attended by 1,850 visitors. Today, the largest markets attract more than 50,000 attendees from all 50 states and 84 countries.

The Trade Mart was the destination of United States President John F. Kennedy's motorcade on November 22, 1963 when he was assassinated in Dealey Plaza. He was scheduled to give a speech to 2,600 people at a sold-out luncheon in the Grand Courtyard. Notable guests awaiting Kennedy's arrival included Market Center partners Trammell Crow and John Stemmons; J. Erik Jonsson, one of the owners of Texas Instruments; and Dallas Mayor Earle Cabell. Special dispensation had been arranged to allow the Catholics to eat the planned steak main course at the luncheon.

On October 12, 1964, English sculptor Elisabeth Frink created the bronze sculpture The Eagle which sits outside the main entrance today. It features a William Blake quote and a plaque which reads, "Placed in memorial by the friends of United States President John Fitzgerald Kennedy who awaited from his arrival at the Dallas Trade Mart on November 22, 1963 when he was assassinated in Dealey Plaza."

Trade events and markets 
Dallas Market Center hosts dozens of trade events throughout the year, including nine major markets attracting some 200,000 retail buyers.

The Accessories Resource Team (ART), the trade association for home decorative accessories, partners with Dallas Market Center to sponsor the ARTS Awards gala held each January which recognizes excellence and achievement in retailing, manufacturing, design, and representation.

The Toy Industry Association holds its Fall Toy Preview at Dallas Market Center each fall. This show for mass market retailers is the toy industry's most important preview of products under development for the following year.

In popular media
Portions of the 1976 film Logan's Run were filmed in the Apparel Mart. The 1984 slasher movie The Initiation was filmed in the World Trade Center.

See also 
 Infomart
 Trademart Brussels

References

External links
 Dallas Market Center
 Market Center Management Company
 
 
 

Buildings and structures in Dallas
Economy of Dallas
Buildings and structures associated with the assassination of John F. Kennedy
1957 establishments in Texas
Commercial buildings completed in 1957